Bernice MacNaughton High School (usually abbreviated as Bernice MacNaughton, MacNaughton, or BMHS), is a high school in Moncton, New Brunswick, Canada.

Name 
Bernice MacNaughton High School was named after Dr. L. Bernice MacNaughton, a Moncton teacher, and was formerly known as Dr. L. Bernice MacNaughton High School.

History 
Founded in 1975 as a trade school, Bernice MacNaughton originally accommodated 1,400 students. It became the MacNaughton Science & Technology Center (MSTC) in 1994 but was reestablished as a high school in 1999, consisting only of grade nine students. 2003 saw the first graduating class of BMHS. MacNaughton underwent an extensive multi-million dollar renovation between 2000 and 2003; additions included construction of a new gymnasium and several classrooms, landscaping, additional lighting, and driveway resurfacing. The auditorium was renovated in 2006. By 2008, a new roof for the school's cafeteria had been completed.

In November 2012, the City of Moncton announced that it would contribute $750,000 toward a new artificial turf sports field on MacNaughton's grounds. The Province of New Brunswick later announced that it would invest a further $400,000 toward the sports field, which was used as a training ground for the 2014 FIFA Under-20 Women's World Cup.

Facilities 
MacNaughton is located in Moncton's West end and is within walking distance of the city's walking trails and Centennial Park. Its campus offers access to cross-country ski trails and two sports fields. The school features a large, central cafeteria and foyer, and the auditorium can support fully orchestrated theatrical and musical productions. BMHS also has several science laboratories, special woodworking and metalworking shops, two art rooms, a darkroom, several computer labs, and two music rooms.

Academic life

Courses 
Bernice MacNaughton High School runs on a two-semester arrangement. Most courses run on a full-semester basis, but some grade nine specialty courses (e.g. physical education, visual arts) are half-semester courses. MacNaughton offers students a wide variety of courses, from aviation technology to Mandarin, as well as three Advanced Placement courses: Chemistry, English Literature and Composition, and Psychology. Classes commence at 08:45 (AST) and end at 15:30 AST. Students take five sixty-minute courses every day, with an hour-long break between the third and fourth classes and seven- or eight-minute breaks between all other classes.

In 2008, BMHS implemented a thirty-minute directed learning period, known colloquially as "Period 6", in order to allow fellow Clan members to jointly study, work on homework, or seek extra help. During the 2009–2010 school year, the directed learning period was moved to 10:54 AST, between the second and third period. In the 2012–2013 school year, the directed learning period was rotated throughout the day as a function of the day of the week. The directed learning period was removed in the 2013–2014 school year.

House system 
Upon arrival at MacNaughton, students are automatically and randomly sorted into one of four houses called "Clans", in reference to the Highland Scottish clans Campbell, MacDonald, MacLeod, and Stewart. Eight twelfth grade students are appointed to lead each Clan.

Extracurricular activities 
BMHS offers a wide array of extracurricular activities:

Athletics 
MacNaughton offers a wide selection of sports clubs and organized teams at the junior varsity and senior varsity, male and female, levels. These vary from year to year and include:

Badminton
Baseball
Basketball
Cross country
Curling
Field hockey
Football
Golf
Rugby union
Soccer
Track and field

Volleyball
Wrestling

Bernice MacNaughton has captured New Brunswick Interscholastic Athletic Association (NBIAA) sports titles in 12 man football (2004, 2006–2008, 2011), girls' field hockey (2005), AAA junior girls' basketball (2005–2006), AAA senior girls' basketball (2007), junior men's wrestling (2005), and AAA senior boys' volleyball (2007).

Bike Club 
The BMHS Bike Club  was an after-school program where members built custom motorcycles and bicycles. In 2008, they completed a custom bobber motorcycle, dubbed "Betty".

Breakfast club 
The BMHS breakfast club serves a free breakfast to students on school mornings.

Reach for the Top 
BMHS's intermediate and senior Reach for the Top teams compete in provincial tournaments.

School newspaper 
The school newspaper has undergone frequent name changes. The latest edition, entitled The Highlander, was published in 2014.

Student government 
BMHS's students' union consists of thirteen positions:

President
Vice-President
Senior Treasurer
Junior Treasurer
School Spirit
Student Activities
Extra Curricular Activities and Liaison
2 At Large Positions
Secretary
Grade 9 Representative
Grade 10 Representative
Grade 11 Representative
Grade 12 Representative

Membership in the school's Student Government is mandatory, and students are admitted as ordinary members of the Government upon payment of the school's nominal tuition fee. Elections for the upcoming year are held on the first Friday after May Day (May 1) of the previous year. The Senior Treasurer is chosen via interview. Grade Representatives are selected in October.

Yearbook 
The annual BMHS yearbook is entitled ceilidh.

Theatrical productions

Musical productions 
Bernice MacNaughton has performed fourteen musicals and one collection of Broadway show tunes:
Oliver! (2003)
Nunsense (2003)
The Sound of Music (2004)
Nunsense 2: The Second Coming (2005)
Broadway meets the Bard, a collection of Broadway songs and Shakespeare excerpts (December 2005)
Grease (2006)
West Side Story (April 18–21, 2007)
Crazy for You (April 23–26, 2008)
Bye Bye Birdie (April 22–25, 2009)
White Christmas (December 9–12, 2009)
The Phantom of the Opera (April 6–8, 2011)
The Drowsy Chaperone (December 7–10, 2011)
Grease (2013)
Sympathy Jones (November 20–23, 2013)
Carrie: The Musical (November 26–29, 2014)
Shrek The Musical (2015)
 Mamma Mia! (2018)

Dramatic productions 
Bernice MacNaughton has presented several dramatic productions:
Lord of the Flies (2001)
Our Town (November 28–December 1, 2007)
Scenes from an Italian Restaurant, an original composition consisting of a series of ten-minute plays (November 2008)
Scenes in the Key of Life, an original composition consisting of a series of ten-minute plays and musical performances (2010)
Ralph's Basement, an original composition (June 3–5, 2010)
Alien Grunge Love (2014)

Notable alumni 

Courtney Sarault - Canadian short track speed skater, won many world medals.
Danielle Doris - Canadian Olympian who won gold at the 2020 Para-Olympics.
Chip White - Great friend, honourary Newfoundlander.

See also 

Anglophone East School District

References

External links 
BMHS Website
Anglophone East School District Website

Educational institutions established in 1975
High schools in Moncton
1975 establishments in New Brunswick